On 14 August 2021, Ayesha Akram, a social media celebrity, was sexually assaulted by a crowd at Minar-e-Pakistan, Lahore, Pakistan. In a video recording of the incident that went viral days later, the crowd was seen picking up the woman, throwing her up in the air between them, tearing off her clothes, and assaulting and groping her.

The incident caused widespread outrage in Pakistan, with the Amnesty International and many of Pakistan's prominent figures expressing their outrage and disgust over the assault.

Incident 

Ayesha Akram, a nurse by profession and freelance TikToker and YouTube vlogger, was attacked, molested, and looted, along with her team members, by a large crowd in the evening of 14 August 2021. The incident took place on the 75th independence anniversary of Pakistan in the precincts Minar-e-Pakistan near Greater Iqbal Park. According to reports, the situation lasted from 6:30 p.m. to 8:40 p.m. In her first information report, Akram stated that she and her six companions were shooting a video near the monument when a mob of around 300 to 400 people surrounded and attacked them. Akram was quoted as saying "the crowd was huge and people were scaling the enclosure and coming towards us". Akram stated that she and her companions tried as hard as they could to escape from the crowd. Observing the situation, the park's security guard opened the gate to the enclosure around Minar-e-Pakistan. Akram said that the men broke and jumped over the fence, surged towards her, and started pulling on her. She said that as they grasped her, they tore off her clothes and tossed her into the air. She explained that some men tried to help her, but the crowd was overwhelmingly large and they were unable to do anything at that moment.

They forcefully took off her gold ring and gold earrings, Akram said. The police could not respond to calls in time and spectators of the event were unable to help.

According to team leader Zaman Qureshi of the first response police team of the Dolphin Force, they had to rescue Akram, of whom they found in a very vulnerable condition. Their team had to provide her with drinking water and a shirt to cover herself, since her clothes were torn apart by the instigators.

Medicolegal examination
A medical examination of Akram was conducted at the Nawaz Sharif Teaching Hospital on 19 August 2021. On 20 August 2021, the Punjab government issued the medical examination report of Akram which confirmed details of her injuries after being assaulted. According to a medicolegal report, the victim was found to have dozens of bruises and scratches on the body including her chest, waist, legs and elbow, plus inflammation on the neck and hands.

Police investigation

Initial investigation
Punjab police formed four special teams for investigating the assault. They sent 30 videos and 60 photographs to Pakisan's national database for identification. They also geo-fenced 28,000 people by examining call records made between 6:30 and 7:47 p.m. on 14 August. They shortlisted 350 suspects, two of whom qualified for pre-arrest bail. The police initially arrested 161 suspects; however, as the victims could identify only six of them in an identification parade, the police had released 155 of the suspects by 7 September.

One pending case challan nominated six suspects, and the other challan nominated 11 suspects, of which included men and teenage boys; the case was scheduled to come before court on 6 September 2022. A sessions court lead by Ishrat Abbas issued non bailable warrants against seven non-appearing suspects and rescheduled the hearing to 30 September 2022. Prosecution attorneys expressed concern over the considerable delay taking place due to defendant objections.

October arrests
On 8 October 2021, police announced that they had arrested eight suspects and charged them with assaulting Akram on August 14. Among the eight arrested was one of her associates. Akram accused the associate of masterminding the incident. She further accused him of recording videos of her and blackmailing her for money, stating that she had already paid her associate 1 million in extortion costs. The families of the suspects protested against the suspects' arrests outside of the police station.

The associate's lawyer denied the allegations and demanded bail for the associate on the basis that the police had completed the questioning and that Akram had allegedly given conflicting statements. The prosecution maintained that the associate was guilty and opposed the granting of bail.

Debate in media and social media 
The rapid increase in cases of violence against women provoked a debate about the failure to protect women in Pakistan, examining the culture of impunity for perpetrators and the reasons behind society's perceived tendency to restrain women's independence and inflict pain on them. In a video interview given to Deutsche Welle, journalist Arzoo Kazmi commented that following Akram's assault, Pakistani society was sliding back into regressive, "conservative" policies like those of the Zia-ul-Haq era, noting how restrictions on women's freedom of movement and education leads to disrespectful behavior towards women in public places. Many politicians and public figures, including activists, celebrities, and members of civil society, condemned the incident on social and mainstream media. Mehmil Khalid Kunwar quoted a report by the advocacy group Sustainable Social Development Organisation (SSDO), noting 6,754 women were kidnapped and 1,890 raped in the first six months of 2021 in Punjab province alone, but the rate of reporting in media of these events remained low. Kunwar says the low publicity of such incidents makes women feel more vulnerable about their security and protection in social settings.

The hashtags "Minar-e-Pakistan", "Lahore incident" and "400 men, yes all men" trended on social media. "#YesAllMen" trended, in refutation to the phrase "not all men" that is frequently used by men in response to incidents of sexual violence against women in Pakistan. Some sectors of the Pakistani society said the victim and her friend had invited fans and that her boldness displayed in her TikTok videos contributed to the incident. Some, using the hashtag "#NotAllMen", said the assault was a publicity stunt organised by Akram. A court case against Akram was filed to that effect, but the court rejected the petition. The Prime Minister of Pakistan at the time, Imran Khan, blamed the incident on the availability of smartphones. His remarks made many critics of Khan recall a previous statement from June 2021, stating that "…if a woman is wearing very few clothes it will have an impact on the men unless they are robots… If you raise temptation in society to a point – and all these young guys have nowhere to go – it has a consequence in the society". He was criticised for suggesting that an increase in sexual violence was related to how women dress and behave. Other sectors of the media criticised these explanations as victim-blaming.

Salman Akram Raja, a prominent supreme court advocate in Pakistan, argued that "the boys must be punished but the woman asked for it", claiming the victim to be an attention-seeking conspirator against Pakistan. Raja explained that a cursory study of Muttahida Ulema Board-approved Single National Curriculum textbooks since 2020 indicated the resumed standard of the idealised "good woman/child" and that Akram "failed that norm."

According to Kamila Hyat of The News International, certain people argued that Akram was responsible for provoking the violence against herself, perhaps by blowing kisses to some of her fans, of whom she supposedly invited to the event; by posing for selfies with people in her own group; or by allowing the young man who had accompanied her to put an arm around her shoulder. Hyat said the fact that the victim did not consent to being groped, hustled, thrown into the air, squeezed, and almost rendered unconscious is "evident." Actress Yashma Gill explained that since men have the free will and power to choose right from wrong, the victim is blameless. According to journalist Rajaa Moini, Akram was physically assaulted and faced exceedingly negative scrutiny because for many Pakistanis, her visibility on TikTok – freely accessing "digital freedoms" – was construed to mean that she had questionable morals, which validated the attack to prevent cultural degradation. Moini said that enabling and justifying violence, specifically against women, often involved the weaponisation of their personal information. 

Vlogger Maria Amir noted that having video evidence go viral on social media is not beneficial to the victim of the situation, but is often the only way to attract public attention and assemble enough indignation to motivate authorities to take action. She also argues that viral videos have also been effective in persuading Pakistani men that violence against women is both "real and deadly." According to Muhammad Moiz, a global policy practitioner, while TikTok and Instagram – as well as the increased visibility they provide – are newer technology, women, as well as those who "chastise them for engaging in acts of self-expression and pleasure" have become highly prominent in social media. Moiz and Shmyla Khan, activists for digital privacy and online gender expression, note that digital media simply imports "preexisting power structures" to social media platforms, creating "more tools to commit violence with."

Moini noted that gendered treatment of the word azad holds "a unique place in the Urdu lexicon, inspiring equal levels of reverence, pride, and in the context of women, utter hostility and revulsion." In Pakistan, azad mulk (a free country) is, as stated by Moini, cause for "celebration and revelry", yet azad aurat (a free woman) "is met with accusations of cultural degradation, an active threat to the nation at best, and a justification for barbaric violence against her at worst." Amir concurred, pointing out the powerful symbolisation of how Pakistanis have "twisted the very meaning of 'independence' and 'freedom' to cater solely to one gender at the expense of another." Media and feminists also questioned and expressed outrage over harassment against women in another set of seven cases in and around Lahore since the Minar-e-Pakistan incident, including the harassment of a woman traveling by rickshaw in Lahore on pre-Independence Day evening, a man removing his pants to taunt a woman in another, and the mockery of Pakistani actress Mehwish Hayat's Independence Day message by discussing the colour of her bra beneath her traditional Kurta top. Journalist Anmol Irfan reflected on the irony that most media interviews of the victims were by male journalists who seemingly did not receive the same kinds of threats.

Reactions 

The incident caused widespread outrage in Pakistan, with the Amnesty International and many of Pakistan's prominent figures expressing their outrage and disgust over the assault. Amnesty said that the daytime attack, in a public place, on a woman on 14 August is alarming. In these times when Pakistan is struggling with violent crimes like the murders of Noor Mukadam and Qurat ul Ain, this event heightens fears even more. As per Deutsche Welle's report, victim blaming towards women in Pakistan is not surprising at all and the situation is not likely to change any time soon.

Celebrity reactions
Many celebrities took to social media to express outrage and ask the higher-ups to serve justice to the victim with some left completely stunned over the audacity of the perpetrators. Pakistani religiously conservative scriptwriter Khalil-ur-Rehman Qamar said he concedes that a woman's honour and dignity is not secure in Pakistan, he does not know to whom to blame and he is attempting to "understand the psychological level and state of mind of the 400 men around there..." Mahira Khan said she couldn't believe what she saw, and asked for making an example out of oppressive men. In her next tweet she pointed out victim blaming in Pakistan saying, "..Damn, I'm sorry, I keep forgetting – it was HER fault! Poor 400 men, they couldn't help it..." Yashma Gill said the case cannot be any thing else than a harassment case, presumption otherwise for the victim to have planted 400 men is unbelievable. Gill further said that "even if one considers that the victim to have supposedly planted three or four men, and the rest of the men just followed the first ones, then of course, she planted them, but in that case did not those men have free will? They had the power to choose right from wrong, and still they chose wrong. So those men need to be blamed as well. One can not keep victim-blaming only."

Actor Mansha Pasha said "What they will say: Pakistan is an Islamic Republic and Madina ki riyasat. What is the reality: Woman molested by 400 men at Minare Pakistan on Independence Day during Azaan. We preach religion and patriotism here but we follow hedionism and barbarism."
Vlogger Shaheer Jaffery commented on the incident through a series of Tweets saying "The truth is, it doesn't matter what the educated Twitter class thinks or says. The majority of people are just trolls and would see what happened as 'just'!" Jaffery says he believes Pakistanis would defend their sisters and daughters to the point that they would lay down their lives for them. At the same time, some random girl passing by is considered an opportunity to harass. He expresses that there is a disconnect with feeling empathy for another human. Jaffery goes on to say that once at a mall in Pakistan he and his friends were not allowed for not being with female family members and he understood men were considered a threat to Pakistani women in earlier times and they still remain a threat. Jaffery also added "...The girl screams for help as she's groped by hundreds of men. There is Azaan going on in the background. I'm finding it hard to wrap my head around that scenario.."  
Pakistani comedian Ali Gul Pir said that "If we accept [their theory] that she went for a TikTok meeting,...what those 400 men did was wrong, was a crime and was horrible."

Political reactions
The President of Pakistan, Dr Arif Alvi, said it was regretful that people opted to film the harassment at the Minar-e-Pakistan incident instead of forbidding the wrongdoers. He also said it is equally essential to teach the society on proper ethics and its responsibilities to each other. He went on to say, "The whole society needs to learn to provide women the space which is needed for security"
Maryam Nawaz said, "Heart-wrenching scenes at Minar-e-Pakistan warrant collective introspection. We as parents, teachers and leaders need to reflect upon the upbringing of our youngsters to make public spaces safe for women. Those involved must be dragged to justice to create a deterrence for the future."
Prime Minister Imran Khan said he was "ashamed and pained" by the assault on a female TikToker by hundreds of men near Minar-e-Pakistan. He referred to the lack of proper upbringing of the youth and children's greater exposure to things because of mobile phones. He called for the need to teach children the Seerat-un-Nabi — biographies of Muhammad. Minister for Human Rights Shireen Mazarisaid that as laws do exist, the effective implementation of those laws would certainly prove to be a deterrent, but mindsets need to change too.
The Leader of the Opposition in the National Assembly, Shehbaz Sharif, stated, "..What is more worrying is the direction our society is headed in. The recent anti-women incidents are a reminder that malaise is deep-rooted. Very shameful!"
PPP Chairperson Bilawal Bhutto Zardari said, "..The assault of a young woman by a mob at #minarepakistan should shame every Pakistani. It speaks to a rot in our society,.."

Other reactions
 Karachi-based lawyer and human rights activist Jibran Nasir expressed concerns about the widespread victim-blaming on social media by blaming the actions of the hundreds of men on the woman they assaulted. He said, "..Why are crimes committed against a man seen as an exception despite his own conduct but crimes against a woman [are] considered a natural outcome of her actions?"
 Some conservatives took the opportunity to, again, criticise the slogan Mera. Jism, Meri Marzi. Where as many feminists media columns such as Soha Nisar claimed continued headlines like the Minar-e-Pakistan incident showed that women are still being objectified and patriarchal gender is still far from understanding the true essence of women. Until and unless women take ownership of their bodies, they will never be liberated from the control of men hence the slogan Mera. Jism, Meri Marzi becomes much more pertinent.
Global concern over the incident questioned why Pakistan was not able to provide a safe environment for women against sexual violence even at its national monument and during a national holiday.

Protests
Prominent organisations like supporters of Aurat March, Tehreek-e-Niswan, Aurat Foundation, Human Rights Commission of Pakistan, Women Action Forum, War Against Rape and Sindh Commission of the Status of Women took part in protests in Karachi and Lahore.

Impact and legacy 
The delayed police response lead to suspensions and transfers of some of the concerned police officials in Lahore. According to DIG Investigator Shariq Jamal Khan, a 300 percent rise in registration of sexual assault cases can be observed in Lahore within one and a half months of the Minar-e-Pakistan mass assault case. Jamal Khan said that sexual assaults more commonly happened in Lahore prior to the Minar-e-Pakistan incident but it seemed to have inspired women to come forward and register First Information Reports against crimes more confidently. At the end of 2021, media in Pakistan, namely Dawn, The News International, Geo TV and Aaj TV, counted the Minar-e-Pakistan incident of August 14 as one of the most talked about incidents of assault against women in Pakistan.

See also 
 Violence against women in Pakistan
 Mass sexual assault
 Mera Jism Meri Marzi
 Dolphin Force

References 

Attacks on buildings and structures in Pakistan
Attacks on buildings and structures in Lahore
Mass sexual assault
Incidents of violence against women
Sexual harassment
Violence against women in Pakistan
2021 in Pakistan